The 2010 D.C. United season was the club's 16th year of existence, as well as their 15th season in Major League Soccer, and their 15th consecutive season in the top flight of American soccer.

After three seasons with Tom Soehn, Soehn resigned from duty on mutual agreement, and became the Athletic Director for the Vancouver Whitecaps FC. On December 28, 2009, United announced the signing of Curt Onalfo, the former Kansas City Wizards coach who had previously been fired following a 6–0 defeat to Dallas in August 2009.

United began the season by with a 4–0 defeat from Kansas City at CommunityAmerica Ballpark on March 27. Their final match was a 3–2 loss to Toronto at RFK Stadium on October 23. Statistically, the 2010 season was United's worst overall season on record in MLS, tallying a record 20 losses, and 17 games being shut out, which broke the original record of 15. United also set the record for fewest goals scored in an MLS season (21) shattering the old record set by Toronto in 2007 when the Reds only scored 24. The poor record resulted in their head coach, Onalfo, being fired on August 4, becoming the first United coach in history to be fired during a regular season. Subsequently, Ben Olsen became the interim coach for the remainder of the season.

Although the team had an abysmal regular season showing, they excelled in U.S. Open Cup competition, making a run to the semifinals, before bowing out against Columbus.

Background

Preseason 
To prepare for the 2010 season, United participated in the Carolina Challenge Cup, hosted friendlies at the IMG Academy in Florida, as well as traveled to Mexico to take on Santos Laguna.

Regular season

March–April 

D.C. United began their fifteenth Major League Soccer regular season on the road with a match against the Kansas City Wizards on March 27, 2010 followed by their first home match against the New England Revolution on April 3, 2010.  Then they faced the Philadelphia Union. United would drop three more consecutive season games in April, which led the club off to a 0–5–0 start, their worst in franchise history.

Their first match of April was on April 3, where United fell late against the Revolution thanks to two goals from Kevin Mansally in the 80th and 82nd minutes. It was the first time in seven years that United fell at home against the Revolution.

On April 10, United traveled out to Philadelphia to take on an expansion MLS franchise, the Philadelphia Union, at Lincoln Financial Field. In front of a crowd of 34,000, United lost 3–2 in the Union's home-opener. In spite of the loss, goals from Santino Quaranta and Jaime Moreno accounted for United's first goals of the 2010 season.

A week later, United had their worst start of the season, falling 2–0 to the Chicago Fire at home, giving the club an 0–3–0 home record, and a 0–2–0 away record. In spite of the poor start, there were some signs of good things to come, with United taking in their first victory since the Carolina Challenge Cup during a U.S. Open Cup play-on proper match against Dallas on April 28. There, United took a 4–2 win, and edged closer to Open Cup qualification.

May 

May started off on poor terms for United. On May 1, in an Atlantic Cup derby match against New York Red Bulls, United lost at home to the Red Bulls for the first time since 2003, as well as broke their 1996 record for worst start of the season, losing their first five matches.

Onalfo received sharp criticism from fans and the media alike, but expressed hope and optimism for a turnaround during the season. Some minor hope was restored on May 5, when United avenged their four-goal defeat against Kansas City earlier in March. Thanks to a pair of goals from the recently acquired Danny Allsopp, United won 2–1, as the Wizards became the first MLS club to lose to United since March. 

United remained in the cellar of the Eastern Conference, as well as the overall standings, as they lost their next three games: two in Texas and one at home. Frustration continued to mount as their May 8 and May 15 matches against Dallas and Colorado, respectively, both ended in one-goal defeats.

A 2–0 loss in Houston left United far in last with goals scored (5) and far in front with goals allowed (16).

In the wrath of a horrendous start to the season, United had scheduled a friendly against the Italian Serie A giants, A.C. Milan. Although missing several of their regular starters, it was expected to be a very, ugly, one-sided match. Ironically, United would pull of a shock 3–2 victory over Milan in front of nearly 31,000 fans at RFK Stadium.

The confidence from the Milan-match benefited United in their next two matches; a May 29 come-from-behind victory hosting Chivas USA and a U.S. Open Cup qualifier against Real Salt Lake on June 2.

June 

June began with a pair of matches against Real Salt Lake; one for the U.S. Open Cup, and another for the regular season; both at RFK Stadium. The Open Cup match was played on June 2, with United beating Real Salt Lake 2–1, thanks an Andy Najar-goal after extra time. Three days later, the two sides would play again at the same venue, with the teams drawing no goals apiece.

The success continued from their three victories in the past four games, with United winning their first game on the road for the 2010 season. Before the World Cup break, United defeated the Seattle Sounders FC 3–2 at Qwest Field; a game where United had a three-goal lead thanks a hat trick from Chris Pontius, his first of his career.

During the World Cup break, United scheduled an exhibition match against El Salvador's national team as a fundraiser for the Spanish Catholic Center and United for D.C. United would win the friendly thanks to Adam Christman's lone goal in the 54th minute of play. It has been alleged that many of the Salvadorean players colluded to throw the match. Following the break, United would travel to Columbus to take on the Crew, where they would fall 2–0, accounting for their first and only loss of the month.

United ended the month with a 2–0 victory against the Richmond Kickers at George Mason Stadium. The match was a U.S. Open Cup fourth round match, and United would then play Harrisburg City on July 8 at the Maryland SoccerPlex. With a record of 4–1–1 in all competitions in June, it was United's most successful month of the year.

July 

United started off the fourth month of their campaign on level terms that continued from June. This included a pair of back-to-back road draws at San Jose on July 3 and against their rivals the New York Red Bulls on July 10.

Although they grabbed two road points, they lost consecutively at home. On July 15, a late 89th-minute shot from Roger Levesque gave the Seattle Sounders FC a 1–0 victory over United. Goals from Landon Donovan and Edson Buddle of Los Angeles gave the Galaxy a 2–1 victory against United. The two losses saw United return to last place, relinquishing their brief stint in 14th and 15th place.

Despite their lack of victory during the month, they continued to find success in the U.S. Open Cup in which United won their quarterfinal-match on July 21 against USL Second Division's Harrisburg City, 2–0. The victory would send United to play against Columbus later next month.

The success in the U.S. Open Cup mounted as they thrashed Premier League-relegated Portsmouth 4–0 on July 24. Some was to blame the lack of sleep and lost luggage from Portsmouth during their North American Tour.

United ended a stony note when traveling to Rio Tinto on July 31 to take on the second-place Real Salt Lake. Goals from RSL's panel of stars including Robbie Findley and Alvaro Saborio saw United crash to a 3–0 defeat to end the month.

August 

On August 5, following a league-worst 3–12–3 start to the season, head coach Curt Onlafo was fired. Subsequently, ex-D.C. United player, and assistant coach Ben Olsen became interim head coach for the remainder of the season. His first game as interim head coach was the August 7 league match against New England.

United then dropped another home match against FC Dallas, 3–1 on August 14 before achieving their first win a week later.

Under Olsen's leadership, United earned their first win in over two months in a 2–0 victory over local rivals, the Philadelphia Union on August 22. Danny Allsopp netted both goals, leading him to be the club's scoring leader for the season. The win was soon negated by a 1–0 loss at Chivas USA a few days later.

In hope to salvage their abysmal season, United played a full strength lineup in the U.S. Open Cup semifinals against Eastern Conference-rival Columbus Crew. Thanks to Hernández's 13th-minute penalty kick, United took a 1–0 lead over Columbus for nearly the entire match; however, in the last minute of play, an own goal by Mark Burch forced the game to go into overtime, where a penalty kick from the Crew's captain, Guillermo Barros Schelotto, ultimately led United to bow out of the tournament.

The 2–1 defeat to Columbus made it the first time since 2007 United failed to reach the Open Cup finals. The loss ultimately has made it incredibly difficult and arduous to qualify for the 2011–12 edition of the CONCACAF Champions League.

September 

United would start the month off play against Columbus, once again, at home. A 23rd-minute mishap from keeper Bill Hamid was capitalized by Guillermo Barros Schelotto, which proved to be the difference in the match.

Following the match, having no change for a U.S. Open Cup title, nor a chance to qualify for the 2011–12 CONCACAF Champions League, United took the role of playing the spoiler team, seeing there was virtually little to no chance in qualifying for the play-offs. On September 11, United faced long odds when playing at Toronto FC's BMO Field, where the Reds had only surrendered one loss all season; a 1–4 defeat to New York Red Bulls. In spite of this, an 82nd-minute header from Julius James kept United's slim play-off hopes alive, and increased the gap between Seattle and Toronto in their play-off chase.

Things would not get easier for United, as they would then have to travel to Los Angeles to take on the MLS-league leaders. Thanks to Andy Najar's 60th-minute opener, it seemed as if United would accomplish perhaps the greatest upset during the MLS season. It would fail to be the case thanks to two quick goals from Galaxy captain, Landon Donovan, who netted a pair of goals in the 81st and 86th minute; giving LA the 2–1 victory over the Black-and-Red.

The loss saw United drop to 5–17–3, and mathematically eliminated the club from playoff contention.

A 3–1 home loss against Houston Dynamo on September 25 resulted in United being five points behind Chivas USA, the 15th-place MLS club; the farthest United had been out of last place all season.

October 

United would win 1–0 against Colorado Rapids and not give up a goal after scoring. Danny Allsopp scored. It was their first away win in Colorado since 2001.

During the majority of the month, the club began to work on rebuilding plans for the team. This started out with the signing of Guyanese international, JP Rodrigues on loan from Miami FC of the USSF D2 Pro League. They also signed Junior from Brazil.

D.C. United lost its 19th game 2–0 to San Jose, marking their tenth loss at home, a team worst, as well as the 16th time this season they were shut out, an MLS record. Although United nabbed another point on the road at Chicago Fire to further improve their road record, United grew the MLS record for most shut-outs in a single season (17). The match was Brian McBride's farewell match in Toyota Park.

In Jaime Moreno's final match of his 14-year career with D.C., he started and played 80 minutes in the club's season finale against Toronto FC. Moreno scored on a penalty kick in the 38th minute, but United dropped their 11th at home and their 20th overall to end the season, 3–2.

November 

On November 3, midfielder Andy Najar won the Rookie of the Year Award, ahead of fellow rivals New York's defender, Tim Ream and Philadelphia Union's striker, Danny Mwanga. He was the first United player to win the award since Ben Olsen did so in 1998.

Two weeks later, on November 15, the United and striker Danny Allsopp mutually agreed to terminate his contract valued at $217,000 guaranteed pay from the club. Allsopp was expected to return to Australia's A-League.

Club

2010 roster

Current technical staff

Transfers

In

Out

Loan

In

Out

Statistics

Appearances and goals 

Last updated on November 7.

|}

Top scorers 

Includes all competitive matches. The list is sorted by competition level when total goals are equal.

Last updated on October 24, 2010.

Disciplinary 

Includes all competitive matches. Players with 1 card or more included only.

Last updated on November 1, 2010

Formation 

Starting XI vs. Chicago Fire on Oct. 16.

Overall 

{|class="wikitable"
|-
|Games played || 35 (30 MLS, 5 U.S. Open Cup)
|-
|Games won || 10 (6 MLS, 4 U.S. Open Cup)
|-
|Games drawn ||  4 (4 MLS)
 |-
|Games lost || 21 (20 MLS, 1 U.S. Open Cup)
|-
|Goals scored || 32
|-
|Goals conceded || 52
|-
|Goal difference || −20
|-
|Clean sheets || 8
|-
|Yellow cards || 49
|-
|Red cards || 2
|-
|Worst discipline ||  Julius James 7  0 
|-
|Best result(s) ||W 2–0 (H) v Philadelphia – Major League Soccer – August 22, 2010
|-
|Worst result(s) ||L 4–0 (A) v Kansas City – Major League Soccer – March 17, 2010
|-
|Most appearances ||  Santino Quaranta (34)
|-
|Top scorer ||   Danny Allsopp (8)
|-
|Points || Overall: 22/90 (24.44%)
|-

Competitions

Preseason

Carolina Challenge Cup

Major League Soccer 

D.C. United's fifteenth season in Major League Soccer began on March 27 and ended on October 23. United finished in last place in both the Eastern Conference and the overall standings, for the first time since the 2002 season.

League table 

Conference

Overall

Results summary

Results by round

U.S. Open Cup

Friendlies

Recognition

MLS Rookie of the Year

MLS Player of the Week

MLS All-Stars 2010

References

D.C. United seasons
D.C. United
D.C. United
2010 in sports in Washington, D.C.